Mesoleuca is a genus of moths in the family Geometridae first described by Jacob Hübner in 1825. The name is derived from the Greek mesos (middle) and leucos (white) in reference to the white area in the middle of the forewing.

Species include
 Mesoleuca albicillata – beautiful carpet
 Mesoleuca gratulata – western white-ribboned carpet moth
 Mesoleuca ruficillata – white-ribboned carpet moth

See also

"Mesoleuca Hübner, 1825". ITIS.

References

Larentiini